Andrew Dabb (born in Ogden, Utah; currently residing in Los Angeles) is an American writer, working in the field of television, movies, and graphic novels.

Career 
Andrew Dabb's works include Ghostbusters: Legion, Happydale: Devils in the Desert, and Atomika; as well as the G.I. Joe and Dungeon and Dragons series. Dabb wrote the webcomic series Slices for opi8.com.

Dabb formally wrote for the television show Supernatural on The CW, including the episode "I Believe the Children Are Our Future" and a proposed spin-off, titled Supernatural: Bloodlines. He also penned the series' season 11 finale and took over as co-showrunner for series' final four seasons.

He was the showrunner for  Resident Evil series on Netflix.

Filmography

Film

Television

References

External links
 

Living people
Writers from Los Angeles
American comics writers
American male screenwriters
Writers from Ogden, Utah
Screenwriters from California
Screenwriters from Utah
Year of birth missing (living people)